The 2004–2005 Turkish Cup was the 43rd edition of the annual tournament that determined the association football Super League (Süper Lig) Turkish Cup champion under the auspices of the Turkish Football Federation (TFF). Galatasaray successfully contested over their archrivals Fenerbahçe 5–1 in the final. The results of the tournament also determined which clubs would be promoted or relegated.

Qualifying round

|}

First round

|}

Second round

|}

Bracket

Quarter-finals

|}

Semi-finals

Summary table

|}

Matches

Final

References

External links
 2005 Turkish Cup Final 
 2004–05 Turkish Cup 
https://web.archive.org/web/20060910010728/http://www.turkfutbolu.net/turkiyekupalari/tr04tc.html – Turkey Cup Archive 

2004-05
2004–05 in Turkish football
2004–05 domestic association football cups